The emblem of the Karelo-Finnish Soviet Socialist Republic was adopted on February 10, 1941 by the government of the Karelo-Finnish Soviet Socialist Republic and used until it was absorbed into the Russian Soviet Federative Socialist Republic in 1956.

The emblem is based on the state emblem of the Soviet Union. It shows symbols of agriculture (pine boughs and rye) and the local terrain (a swift-flowing river from the hills). The rising Sun stands for the future of the Karelo-Finnish nation; and the red star as well as the hammer and sickle for the victory of Communism and the "world-wide socialist community of states".

The slogan on the banner bears the Soviet Union state motto ("Workers of the world, unite!") in both the Russian and Finnish languages. In Finnish, it is "Kaikkien maiden proletaarit, liittykää yhteen!".

The name of the Karelo-Finnish SSR is shown in both Russian and Finnish.

From 1956 to 1991, the Karelian Autonomous Soviet Socialist Republic used a variant of the Emblem of the Russian Soviet Federative Socialist Republic.

References

See also
 Coat of arms of the Republic of Karelia

Emblem
Karelo-Finnish SSR
Karelo-Finnish SSR
Karelo-Finnish SSR
Karelo-Finnish SSR
Karelo-Finnish SSR
Karelo-Finnish SSR
Karelo-Finnish SSR
Symbols introduced in 1941